ACD Systems is an independent digital image editing and management company with offices in the United States and Canada. The company was founded in 1994 in Texas by Doug Vandekerkhove. Its products include ACDSee photo editing and management software.  

In April 2003, ACD Systems acquired all of the issued and outstanding shares of LINMOR Inc.'s wholly owned Canadian subsidiary for approximately CDN $2.1 million.

References

External links 
 

Software companies of Canada
Software companies established in 1989
Companies based in Victoria, British Columbia